Zellerrain Pass (elevation 1,125 m, 3,691 ft) is a mountain pass in the Ybbstal Alps, located on border between Lower Austria and Styria, west of Mariazell. The pass road has a steep grade of up to 22 percent. The river Ybbs has its source at the pass.

See also
 List of highest paved roads in Europe
 List of mountain passes

Mountain passes of Styria
Mountain passes of the Alps